Richville is an unincorporated community in Holt County, in the U.S. state of Missouri.

History
Richville was founded in 1860, and named for the richness of their soil. A variant name was Helwig. A post office called Helwig was established in 1895, and remained in operation until 1905.

References

Unincorporated communities in Holt County, Missouri
Unincorporated communities in Missouri